Okanagan Centre  was a federal electoral district in British Columbia, Canada, that was  represented in the House of Commons of Canada from 1988 to 1997. This riding was created in 1987 from parts of Okanagan North and Okanagan—Similkameen, and eliminated in 1996 when it was merged into Kelowna.

Okanagan Centre consisted of the Central Okanagan Regional District.

Members of Parliament

Election results

See also 
 List of Canadian federal electoral districts
 Past Canadian electoral districts

External links 
Riding history from the Library of Parliament

Former federal electoral districts of British Columbia